Tsui Hark (born 1 February 1951), born Tsui Man-kong, is a Hong Kong film director, producer and screenwriter. Tsui has directed several influential Hong Kong films such as Zu Warriors from the Magic Mountain (1983), the Once Upon a Time in China film series (1991–1997) and The Blade (1995). Tsui also has been a prolific writer and producer; his productions include A Better Tomorrow (1986), A Better Tomorrow II (1987), A Chinese Ghost Story (1987),  The Killer (1989), The Legend of the Swordsman (1992), The Wicked City (1992), Iron Monkey (1993) and Black Mask (1996). He is viewed as a major figure in the Golden Age of Hong Kong cinema and is regarded by critics as "one of the masters of Asian cinematography".

In the late 1990s, Tsui had a short-lived career in the United States, directing the Jean-Claude Van Damme–led films Double Team (1997) and Knock Off (1998). Both films were commercially unsuccessful and critically panned; Tsui himself was unsatisfied with his lack of creative control and returned to Hong Kong to continue his career, where he found commercial and critical success with blockbusters such as the Detective Dee film series, Flying Swords of Dragon Gate (2011), and The Taking of Tiger Mountain (2014).

Early life
Tsui was born and raised in Saigon, Vietnam, to a large Chinese (Hoa) family with sixteen siblings. Tsui showed an early interest in show business and films; when he was 10, he and some friends rented an 8 mm camera to film a magic show they put on at school. He also drew comic books, an interest that would influence his cinematic style. By the age of 13, he and his family immigrated to Hong Kong.

Tsui started his secondary education in Hong Kong in 1966. He proceeded to study film in Texas, first at Southern Methodist University and then at the University of Texas at Austin, graduating in 1975. He claims to have told his parents he wanted to follow in his father's footsteps as a pharmacist, and that it was here he changed his given name to Hark ("overcoming").

After graduation, Tsui moved to New York City, where he worked on From Spikes to Spindles (1976), a noted documentary film by Christine Choy on the history of the city's Chinatown. He also worked as an editor for a Chinese newspaper, developed a community theatre group and worked in a Chinese cable TV station. He returned to Hong Kong in 1977.

Career

New Wave period
Upon turning to feature filmmaking, Tsui was quickly typed as a member of the "New Wave" of young, iconoclastic directors. His debut film, The Butterfly Murders (1979), was a technically challenging blend of wuxia, murder mystery and science fiction / fantasy elements. His second film, We're Going to Eat You (1980), was a blend of cannibal horror, black comedy and martial arts.

Tsui's third film, Dangerous Encounters of the First Kind (1980), was a nihilistic thriller about delinquent youths on a bombing spree. Heavily censored by the British colonial government, it was released in 1981 in a drastically altered version titled Dangerous Encounter – 1st Kind (or alternatively, Don't Play with Fire). It was not a financial success. However, it helped make Tsui a darling of film critics who had coined the New Wave label, and who were hopeful for a more aesthetically daring cinema more engaged with the realities of contemporary Hong Kong.

Cinema City
In 1981, Tsui joined Cinema City & Films Co., a production company founded by comedians Raymond Wong, Karl Maka and Dean Shek. Cinema City & Films Co. was instrumental in codifying the slick Hong Kong blockbuster films of the 1980s. Tsui played his part in the process with pictures like the crime farce All the Wrong Clues (1981), his first hit, and Aces Go Places 3 (1984), part of the studio's long-running spy spoof series.

In 1983, Tsui directed the wuxia fantasy film Zu Warriors from the Magic Mountain (1983) for the studio Golden Harvest. Tsui imported Hollywood technicians to help create special effects whose number and complexity were unprecedented in Chinese-language cinema.

Mogul
In 1984, Tsui formed the production company Film Workshop with Nansun Shi. He also developed a reputation as a hands-on and even intrusive producer of other directors' work, fuelled by public breaks with major filmmakers like John Woo and King Hu. His most longstanding and fruitful collaboration has probably been with Ching Siu-tung. As action choreographer and/or director on many Film Workshop productions, Ching made a major contribution to the well-known Tsui style.

Film Workshop releases became consistent box office hits in Hong Kong and around Asia, drawing audiences with their visual adventurousness, their broad commercial appeal, and hectic camerawork and pace. With Tsui having been called the 'Steven Spielberg of Asia', Film Workshop became the 'Amblin of Hong Kong'. He produced John Woo's A Better Tomorrow (1986), which launched a craze for Heroic bloodshed movies, and Ching Siu-tung's A Chinese Ghost Story (1987), which did the same for period ghost fantasies. Zu Warriors from the Magic Mountain and The Swordsman (1990) birthed the modern-day special effects industry in Hong Kong.

In fact, Tsui's "movie brat" nostalgia is one of the main ingredients in his work. He often resurrects and revises classic films and genres: the murder mystery in The Butterfly Murders (1979); the Shanghai musical comedy in Shanghai Blues (1985).  Peking Opera Blues (1986) plays with and pays tribute to the traditions of the Peking opera that his mother took him to see as a small boy and which had such a strong influence on Hong Kong action cinema. The Lovers (1994) adapts a retold, cross-dressing period romance, best known from Li Han-hsiang's 1963 opera film The Love Eterne. A Chinese Ghost Story remakes Li's supernatural romance The Enchanting Shadow (1959) as a special effects action movie.

The pattern is also seen in perhaps Tsui's most successful work to date, the Once Upon a Time in China film series (1991–97). Jet Li played the role of Chinese folk hero Wong Fei-hung in the first three films and the sixth, Once Upon a Time in China and America. This series is the clearest expression in his oeuvre of Tsui's Chinese nationalism and his passionate engagement with the upheavals of Chinese history, particularly in the face of Western power and influence.

Tsui also dabbled in acting, mostly for other directors. Notable roles include one-third of the comic relief trio in Corey Yuen's film Yes, Madam! (1985) and a villain in Patrick Tam's darkly comic crime story Final Victory (1987), written by Wong Kar-wai. He also made frequent cameo appearances in his own productions, such as a music judge in A Better Tomorrow and a phony FBI agent in Aces Go Places II.

In the face of an industry downturn in the '90s, he produced two expensive movies. Green Snake (1993) was a poetic and lyric movie based on a favourite Chinese fairy tale. The Blade (1995) was a gory, deliberately rough-hewn revision of the 1967 wuxia classic The One-Armed Swordsman.

American films
In the mid-to-late '90s, Tsui tried Hollywood with two films starring Jean-Claude Van Damme: Double Team (1997) and Knock Off (1998). In 2002, he made Black Mask 2: City of Masks, an American market sequel to Jet Li's 1996 film. It was released direct-to-video in the United States in December of that year before being theatrically released the next month in Hong Kong.

2000s
Tsui returned to directing at home in 2000 after not having made a local film since 1996.  Time and Tide (2000) and The Legend of Zu (2001) were action extravaganzas with lavish computer-generated imagery that gained cult admirers but no mass success.

Tsui continues to push technical boundaries and revise old favourites. Master Q 2001 was Hong Kong's first combination of live action and Pixar-style 3D computer animation. Era of Vampires (2002; US title, "Tsui Hark's Vampire Hunters") reworked a subgenre popular in the '80s, hybrid martial arts / supernatural horror films featuring the "hopping corpses" of Chinese folk legend.

In 2005, Tsui launched the multimedia production Seven Swords, a film adaptation of Liang Yusheng's novels Saiwai Qixia Zhuan and Qijian Xia Tianshan. The film came with a television series counterpart (Seven Swordsmen), a comic book series, a cellphone game, clothing brand, and an online multi-player video game. The film was relatively successful, and in February 2006 Tsui announced plans to begin filming the second late in the year. As of 2008, Tsui continues to work on the script for Seven Swords 2 in between filming projects. In 2011 there has been no news nor plans about a Seven Swords 2. Rumors has it that due to lack of interest by the filmmakers of finishing the hexalogy lead the project into being cancelled.

In August 2008, Tsui provided art direction for the direct-to-video anime feature titled Kungfu Master (a.k.a. Wong Fei Hong vs Kungfu Panda), an apparent unofficial sequel to Kung Fu Panda, featuring Chinese folk hero Wong Fei-hung. Also in 2008 was the thriller Missing starring Angelica Lee. His latest comedy film All About Women features wonky sound editing and comic graphics.

2010s
Tsui's latest work in 2010 is Detective Dee and the Mystery of the Phantom Flame, a rare but successful blend of wuxia, suspense-thriller, mystery, and comedy, which was in competition for the Golden Lion award and was also nominated and won numerous other awards.

In 2010 he announced his first 3-D film, The Flying Swords of Dragon Gate, which is a re-imagining of his 1992 film New Dragon Gate Inn starring Tony Leung Ka-Fai, Maggie Cheung and Brigitte Lin. In 2011 Huayi Brothers announced that Tsui will be making a prequel to Detective Dee and the Mystery of the Phantom Flame; shot in 3-D, it was released in 2013 as Young Detective Dee: Rise of the Sea Dragon.

In October 2011, Tsui received the Asian Filmmaker of the Year Award at the 16th Busan International Film Festival for his contributions to Hong Kong cinema. He is the fifth Chinese filmmaker to receive this award at Busan.

His film The Taking of Tiger Mountain premiered in China in December 2014.

2020s

Tsui worked on a film with Milkyway Image alongside Ann Hui, Ringo Lam, Patrick Tam, Johnnie To, Sammo Hung and Yuen Woo-Ping. Each director created a segment based on Hong Kong history. The completed film, Septet: The Story of Hong Kong, was shown at the Busan International Film Festival on 21 October 2020 and at the annual Hong Kong International Film Festival in April 2021.

In 2021 Tsui co-directed The Battle at Lake Changjin with Chen Kaige and Dante Lam.

Cultural references
Tsui was featured on a track which bore his name on the 1994 Sparks album Gratuitous Sax & Senseless Violins. (Sparks also provided a song, "It's a Knockoff," for the closing credits of Knock Off.)

Filmography

Television

Acting roles

Other credits

Awards and nominations

Golden Horse Awards

Hong Kong Film Awards

Notes

References

Sources
 Bordwell, David.  Planet Hong Kong: Popular Cinema and the Art of Entertainment. Cambridge, Mass.: Harvard University Press, 2000. .
 Dannen, Fredric, and Barry Long.  Hong Kong Babylon: The Insider's Guide to the Hollywood of the East. New York: Miramax, 1997. .
 Hampton, Howard.  "Once Upon a Time in Hong Kong: Tsui Hark and Ching Siu-tung".  Film Comment July–August 1997: pp. 16–19 & 24–27.
 Morton, Lisa. The Cinema of Tsui Hark. Jefferson, NC: McFarland and Company, Inc., 2001. .
 Teo, Stephen. Hong Kong Cinema: The Extra Dimensions. London: British Film Institute, 1997. .
 Yang, Jeff, and Dina Gan, Terry Hong and the staff of A. magazine.  Eastern Standard Time: A Guide to Asian Influence on American Culture. Boston: Houghton Mifflin, 1997. .
 Bringing a Wealth of Cinematic Knowledge to the Screen in 3-D

Further reading
Ho, Sam, ed.  The Swordsman and His Juang Hu: Tsui Hark and Hong Kong Film. Hong Kong University Press, 2002. .
Schroeder, Andrew. Tsui Hark's Zu: Warriors from the Magic Mountain. Hong Kong: Hong Kong University Press, 2004. .

External links

 

1951 births
Hong Kong male film actors
Hong Kong film directors
Hong Kong film presenters
Hong Kong film producers
Hoa people
Hong Kong people of Hoa descent
Hong Kong screenwriters
Hong Kong male television actors
Living people
People from Ho Chi Minh City
Moody College of Communication alumni
Vietnamese emigrants to Hong Kong
20th-century Hong Kong male actors
21st-century Hong Kong male actors